is fictional character from the Ninja Gaiden series of video games by Team Ninja and Tecmo (Koei Tecmo). She was introduced in the 2004 action game Ninja Gaiden, where she is a human/demon hybrid who serves as a supporting non-playable character and an ally of the protagonist Ryu Hayabusa. Rachel is playable in Ninja Gaiden Sigma and Ninja Gaiden Sigma 2 (including their Plus ports for the PlayStation Vita), as well as in Dead or Alive 5 Ultimate, Dead or Alive 5 Last Round, and Dead or Alive 6, and as a guest character in Musou Orochi 2 Special and Warriors Orochi 3 Hyper. The character has been mostly well received, especially noted for her sex appeal.

Appearances
In 2004's Ninja Gaiden, Rachel is a fiend hunter whom the game's protagonist Ryu Hayabusa meets in the Holy Vigoor Empire, where she is on a mission to destroy the fiends, as well as find her missing sister, Alma, who has become a Greater Fiend. Soon after they first meet, she is captured but soon saved by Ryu. After the battle, she stays with Ayane to recover from her ordeal. She later leaves to search for Alma and follows Doku's spirit through the torn fabric of space and time. She then fights Ishtaros and Nicchae. Despite her best efforts, she is defeated and held captive again. Doku plans to use Rachel as a sacrifice for Alma's awakening. After Ryu wins, Doku is about to kill Rachel, but Alma rush in to protect her sister, taking the fatal blow, and dies in Rachel's arms. Rachel helps Ryu escape the Underworld and witnesses the battle between him and Murai. The remake Ninja Gaiden Sigma tells some the events from her perspective and shows how her actions affected the main plot.

Rachel returns in Ninja Gaiden Sigma 2. In her own chapter, after Ryu and the CIA agent Sonia left Manhattan, Marbus takes over with the disappearance of the Statue of Liberty, resulting in a Fiend infestation. Rachel appears and braves through the hellish night slaying Fiends until she confronts Marbus atop a skyscraper. Rachel defeated Marbus, taking off his other horn and killing him.

Rachel made her first fighting game appearance in Dead or Alive 5 Ultimate and Dead or Alive 5 Last Round, and returned to the series in Dead or Alive 6 as a post-release downloadable content character. She also appears in the crowd-fighting games Musou Orochi 2 Special and Warriors Orochi 3 (including in the game's duel mode), and in the smart phone action card game Hyakuman-nin no Ninja Gaiden. Her costume is available in Super Swing Golf Season 2 and a 1/6 scale PVC figure of Rachel was released by Kotobukiya in 2006.

Design, gameplay and promotion

Team Ninja's Yosuke Hayashi said that when they "were designing new features for Ninja Gaiden Sigma based on feedback from users, the number one request was - make Rachel playable!" This happened even despite the original director and Team Ninja's first boss Tomonobu Itagaki's stance against making Rachel, and the female characters in general, playable in Ninja Gaiden, which was carried into Ninja Gaiden Black and the original Ninja Gaiden II. He also said in 2007: "Obviously, we love the character Rachel, and within the Ninja Gaiden world she plays a really important part, and I'm glad that she's as popular as she is." In 2009, Yosuke called her "a very important part of Team Ninja's games, now and in the future." Dead or Alive 6 director and producer Yohei Shimbori said he is "personally keen" to include Rachel as DLC in this game. Eventually, Rachel was announced to be part of Season 3 Pass DLC.

Regarding the process of turning Rachel into a playable character for Ninja Gaiden Sigma, Hayashi (who directed the game), stated: "As you know our goal with [Ryu] Hayabusa is to make the coolest action game character. So what we're saying now is that if Hayabusa is the coolest male action-game character, and the best-controlling, fastest action-game character, then let's make Rachel the best female action-game character. As you know, there are other action games coming out for PS3 with female lead characters, but I can guarantee you that Rachel is going to kick their asses. We've tweaked everything so that she plays differently than Hayabusa, but is still fast and controllable and feels—I don't have a better way to put it—female. Her actions aren't as calculated and aren't as efficient as Hayabusa's. She has a certain elegance to her that's explicitly female, and so just going in there and playing with her and seeing how she controls, it's obvious that we're going to have a really great character on our hands." A female motion capture actor was employed to create the character's movement. Sigma 2 animation director Sosuke Wakamatsu said they wanted Rachel to be "sexy and powerful".

In Ninja Gaiden Sigma, she is playable for about 20% of the game in her own extra missions, including one in the demo version of the game, Rachel is controlled in a similar way as Ryu but has different attacks and animations and wields the Great Hammer, a powerful weapon designed to eliminate fiends. She can also use a grappling weapon resembling Scorpion's projectile and Link's hookshot, and use sorcery to create a powerful shockwave. The player is able to customize the character's defensive and offensive capabilities by swapping her earrings, which works in similar way as with Ryu's amulets. The game also allows the player to change Rachel's unlockable hairstyles, including long- and short-haired brunette options. Downloadable content (DLC) for Sigma includes a set of survival mode missions called "Rachel Master" and coming with an additional hairstyle. Her addition was the most publicized new feature in the game. In Ninja Gaiden Sigma Plus, Rachel gains several alternate costumes, such as a business suit.

In Ninja Gaiden Sigma 2, she is also a playable character, wearing the same "S&M-style leather outfit" as she did in the original version of the first game as well as some new alternate costumes available via DLC and in Ninja Gaiden Sigma 2 Plus, including one as part of GameStop's pre-order bonuses. She is also available in the multiplayer co-op modes, including self-contained "Team Missions" with their own rules. GamesRadar described this "deadly dominatrix" as "a berserker-style character, the most destructive of all three" alternative playable characters (her, Ayane and Momiji), in part to her "stupidly powerful machine-gun." As in the case of other female characters in the game, Rachel's bust answers to the motion sensing Sixaxis controller.

In Dead or Alive 5 Ultimate/Last Round, Rachel is a heavyweight power-type fighter of a weight class is similar to that of Leon's. Her fighting style is also reminiscent of Spartan-458's in Dead or Alive 4. GameStop pre-order bonuses included a "more mature" bonus costume for Rachel. Dead or Alive 5 Last Round pre-order bonuses included a beach party costume for Rachel from Best Buy. Her wardrobe in Last Round also include a destructible bodysuit designed by Tamiki Wakaki, and the downloadable costumes of Lady Freise from Deception IV: The Nightmare Princess, Kai from the Samurai Warriors series, Dela from Nihon Falcom's Brandish games, Daidōji from Tamsoft's Senran Kagura games, Imina Ibuki from Square Enix's Schoolgirl Strikers, Jurie Crotze from Gust's Atelier Shallie: Alchemists of the Dusk Sea, and the uniform of the Military Police from the manga and anime Attack on Titan.

Reception

GamesRadar's Ben Schroder predicted that "buxom femme fatale Rachel" would be "perhaps the biggest selling point" of Ninja Gaiden Sigma and the website's Mikel Reparaz described her as one of defining characters of the post-2004 Ninja Gaiden games. Eurogamer's Rob Fahey opined that Rachel's mission in Sigma were so interesting that they addition is "arguably the biggest headline feature after the graphical upgrades." Gavin Ogden of Computer and Video Games (CVG) also agreed with this sentiment, calling her "one of the biggest draws to Sigma for those who hammered the Xbox version to death," including himself, and praising Rachel for her gameplay traits; CVG'''s very positive (9/10) review stated that in the headline the "sweet" addition of Rachel "brought sexy back to the hardest ninja game ever." In a similarly rave (also 9/10) review by GameSpot, Kevin VanOrd wrote "the biggest addition is that Rachel is a new playable character. She's a badass buxom babe who (...) may be top-heavy, but she still manages a good number of terrific moves." In their review, PSU.com too stated that "the biggest addition in Sigma is the ability to play as Rachel herself," adding that "despite the gameplay with Rachel being a tad stark, watching her gracefully end an enemy's life is more than satisfying." Less impressed with Rachel, but not the game overall (a nearly-perfect review score of 9.3), Chris Roper of IGN opined her levels were "a decent addition, but they're not fantastic" as "she's not as fun as Ryu;" reviewing Sigma Plus, IGN's Jack DeVries likewise called her "a fun, though less exciting, foil to Ryu."

Rachel has been often regarded as one of the sexiest female characters in video games. As such, she topped the countdown of "gamer babes" by GameTrailers in 2007, ranked third on the list of top "video game chicks" by ActionTrip that same year, and was included among the top nine "video game vixens" by Maxim in 2009. She was ranked as the 23rd "hottest game babe" by GameDaily in 2008, showcased among some of the sexiest "babes of computer games" by Fakt in 2009, and chosen as the 11th "hottest" video game character by Larry Hester of Complex in 2012. MSN had her featured in their 2008 lists of "the best-looking game characters with perfect figures," Furthermore, PLAY ranked her as sixth top "hottest" blonde in games in 2010, and UGO.com ranked her as one of the top 25 "hot ninja girls" in all media in 2011. GamesRadar listed Rachel her alongside Lara Croft and Tekken's Nina and Anna as "top-heavy examples" of video game characters. her breasts have been included on many lists of the finest in video games, including by Playboy, Thanh Niên, Nerdcast, NetEase, TGbus.com, and Tom's Hardware. Her bust was also chosen by GamesRadar UK as one of 2007's best of the year, and placed at the seventeenth and seventh place 2011's lists of top breasts in video game history compiled by GameFront and Joystick Division, respectively.Rich Shivener, 10 Incredible Chests in Video Games , Joystick Division, August 1, 2011.

Some others have criticized aspects of Rachel's character design. Calling Ninja Gaiden the "whoriest game in history" while simultaneously ranking it as the fourth best game of 2004, Eurogamer staff wrote they did not even mean how "Rachel dripping in beastie-ooze is one of the least PC sights of the year." In 2008, Winda Benedetti of NBC News' InGame included Rachel's outfit among the five most preposterous getups in games, commenting that it might not be a practical costume to wear even for a magical battle against demons. GameSpot's VanOrd wrote the "heroine Rachel (the buxom beauty from Ninja Gaiden Sigma) is so impossibly curvaceous that it is a wonder she can stand upright, let alone wield her heavy hammer with such aplomb;" GamesRadar used her image to illustrate "the average bust size is EE" in the article about "10 lies games tell us about women". Including her among ten female characters who have never been featured on their games' cover arts, Samir Torres of VentureBeat wrote that while "Team Ninja sexually exploits all of their female characters, yet Rachel somehow got axed from every modern Ninja Gaiden'' box art."

References

External links
Dead or Alive 6 character profile

Dead or Alive (franchise) characters
Demon characters in video games
Female characters in video games
Fictional demon hunters
Fictional half-demons
Fictional hunters in video games
Fictional hammer fighters
Koei Tecmo protagonists
Ninja Gaiden characters
Twin characters in video games
Video game characters introduced in 2004
Video game characters with superhuman strength
Video game characters who use magic
Woman soldier and warrior characters in video games